Bell Textron Inc. is an American aerospace manufacturer headquartered in Fort Worth, Texas. A subsidiary of Textron, Bell manufactures military rotorcraft at facilities in Fort Worth, and Amarillo, Texas, as well as commercial helicopters in Mirabel, Quebec, Canada.

History

Bell Aircraft

The company was founded on July 10, 1935, as Bell Aircraft Corporation by Lawrence Dale Bell in Buffalo, New York. The company focused on the designing and building of fighter aircraft. Their first fighters were the XFM-1 Airacuda, a twin-engine fighter for attacking bombers, and the P-39 Airacobra. The P-59 Airacomet, the first American jet fighter, the P-63 Kingcobra, the successor to the P-39, and the Bell X-1 were also Bell products.

In 1941, Bell hired Arthur M. Young, a talented inventor, to provide expertise for helicopter research and development. It was the foundation for what Bell hoped would be a broader economic base for his company that was not dependent on government contracts. The Bell 30 was their first full-size helicopter (first flight December 29, 1942) and the Bell 47 became the first helicopter in the world rated by a civil aviation authority, becoming a civilian and military success.

Bell Helicopter
Textron purchased Bell Aerospace in 1960. Bell Aerospace was composed of three divisions of Bell Aircraft Corporation, including its helicopter division, which had become its only division still producing complete aircraft. The helicopter division was renamed Bell Helicopter Company and in a few years, with the success of the UH-1 Huey during the Vietnam War, it had established itself as the largest division of Textron. In January 1976, Textron changed the division's name to Bell Helicopter Textron.

Bell Helicopter had a close association with AgustaWestland. The partnership dated back to separate manufacturing and technology agreements with Agusta (Bell 47 and Bell 206) and as a sublicence via Agusta with Westland (Bell 47). When the two European firms merged, the partnerships were retained, with the exception of the AB139, which is now known as the AW139. Bell and AW cooperated also on the AW609 tiltrotor.

Bell planned to reduce employment by 760 in 2014 as fewer V-22s were made. A rapid prototyping center called XworX assists Bell's other divisions in reducing development time.

The company was rebranded as "Bell" on February 22, 2018.

Product list
Established in 1986, its Mirabel, Quebec facility assembles and delivers most Bell's commercial helicopters and delivered its 5,000th helicopter on December 12, 2017.

Commercial helicopters

Gallery

Military helicopters
 Bell H-12
 Bell H-13 Sioux
 Bell XH-13F
 Bell XH-15
 Bell HSL
 Bell UH-1 Iroquois (or Huey)
 Bell Huey family
 Bell UH-1 Iroquois variants
 Bell UH-1N Twin Huey
 Bell YHO-4
 Bell 207 Sioux Scout – experimental attack helicopter
 Bell 533 – experimental Huey variant with increased performance
 Bell AH-1 Cobra
 Bell AH-1 SeaCobra/SuperCobra
 Bell 309 KingCobra - experimental attack helicopter
 YAH-63/Model 409 – competitor with the YAH-64 for Advanced Attack Helicopter program
 Bell OH-58 Kiowa
 H-1 upgrade program
 Bell UH-1Y Venom
 Bell AH-1Z Viper
 Bell CH-146 Griffon
 Bell ARH-70 Arapaho - cancelled armed reconnaissance helicopter
 Bell 360 Invictus - proposed armed reconnaissance helicopter

Tiltrotors

 Bell XV-3
 Bell XV-15
 Bell Pointer
 Bell V-247 Vigilant – currently in development
 Bell V-280 Valor – currently in development, first flown 2017
 V-22 Osprey – with Boeing BDS
 TR918 Eagle Eye UAV
 Quad TiltRotor – with Boeing BDS
 Bell BAT (1984 tiltrotor project for LHX programme – not built)
 Bell CTR-1900 (Tilt-rotor project only – not built)
 Bell CTR-22 (Tilt-rotor project only – not built)
 Bell CTR-750 (Tilt-rotor project only – not built)
 Bell CTR-800 (Tilt-rotor project only – not built)
 Bell D-326 (Clipper 1980 commercial tilt-rotor project – not built)

Projects produced by other companies
 AgustaWestland AW139 helicopter (formerly 50-50 as the Agusta-Bell AB139, now 100% AgustaWestland)
 AgustaWestland AW609 tiltrotor (formerly 50-50 as the Bell-Agusta BA609, now 100% AgustaWestland)
 Lockheed Martin VH-71 Kestrel

Unproduced designs
 Bell 280 (project only, twin-engined wide-body variant of the Cobra)
 Bell D-218
 Bell D-230 (Flying Jeep project – not built)
 Bell D-245
 Bell D-246
 Bell 400 TwinRanger (1984), cancelled 206-derived light twin 
 Bell D-292 (1985), Light Helicopter Experimental (LHX) prototype
 Bell 417 (2006) cancelled Bell 407 growth variant
 Bell FCX-001, March 2017 concept

Facilities
Bell manufacturing and support facilities are:

Military
 Fort Worth, Texas - located at six manufacturing facilities throughout the DFW area; of these six the Manufacturing Technology Center (MTC) in Fort Worth, Texas serves as the primary manufacturing development facility of the Bell V-280 Valor, Bell 360 Invictus
 Amarillo, Texas: located near Rick Husband Amarillo International Airport; assembly plant for H1, V-22 and 525

Commercial
 Mirabel, Quebec, Canada: opened in 1983 and located next to Montreal-Mirabel International Airport; it produces components for Bell 429, 505 and 525; assembly plant for 505 and finally assembly for current commercial products for Canadian market

See also

 Leonardo Helicopters
 Airbus Helicopters
 Sikorsky Aircraft

References

External links

Bell timeline at the Helicopter History Site
Video history of Bell Helicopter

Helicopter manufacturers of the United States
Defense companies of the United States
Helicopter manufacturers of Canada
Manufacturing companies based in Fort Worth, Texas
Textron
Vehicle manufacturing companies established in 1935
1935 establishments in New York (state)
1960 mergers and acquisitions